Jaelin Williams (born 29 November 1997) is a  professional footballer who plays as a right-back for the Lassen Cougars. Born in the United States, Williams represents the Bahamas national football team.

International career
Williams was born in the United States, and is of Bahamian descent through his mother. Williams made his debut for the Bahamas national football team in a 4-0 2019–20 CONCACAF Nations League qualifying loss to Belize on 7 September 2018.

References

External links
 Profile
 Andrews College Profile

1997 births
Living people
People from Brunswick, Georgia
Soccer players from Georgia (U.S. state)
Bahamian footballers
Bahamas international footballers
American soccer players
American people of Bahamian descent
Association football fullbacks